Joe Hogan (27 March 1909 – 4 November 1993) was an Australian rules footballer who played with Melbourne in the Victorian Football League (VFL). He later played for Coburg in the Victorian Football Association.

Notes

External links 

1909 births
Australian rules footballers from Victoria (Australia)
Melbourne Football Club players
Ballarat Imperial Football Club players
1993 deaths
Coburg Football Club players